The twenty-fifth season of British science fiction television series Doctor Who began on 5 October 1988. It comprised four separate serials, beginning with Remembrance of the Daleks and ending with The Greatest Show in the Galaxy. To mark the 25th anniversary season, producer John Nathan-Turner brought back the Daleks and the Cybermen. The American New Jersey Network also made a special behind-the-scenes documentary called The Making of Doctor Who, which followed the production of the 25th anniversary story Silver Nemesis. Andrew Cartmel script edited the series.

Background

Season 25 saw script editor Andrew Cartmel, who had joined for the previous season, exert a greater influence on the style of the series. He had watched serials from the Philip Hinchcliffe and Robert Holmes era such as The Seeds of Doom and The Talons of Weng-Chiang in preparation for it and concluded that the series should return to a more serious and dramatic approach. The season also saw the start of a move to explore the Doctor's past; Cartmel had felt that as more of the character's own history, together with the history of the Time Lords, had been revealed, some of the mystery about the Doctor had been lost. As a consequence, together with new writers Ben Aaronovitch and Marc Platt, he began developing the seeds of a new backstory, which would be hinted at throughout the season, that suggested the Doctor to be more powerful than most people were aware of. This concept eventually came to be known as the "Cartmel Masterplan".

Casting

Main cast 
 Sylvester McCoy as the Seventh Doctor
 Sophie Aldred as Ace

Recurring stars 
 Terry Molloy as Davros

Terry Molloy makes his final appearance as Davros, the Dalek creator (now acting as the Dalek Emperor) in Remembrance of the Daleks.

Guest Stars 
John Leeson who previously regularly voiced the robot companion K9 from 1977–1978 and 1980–1981, appears as one of the Dalek voices in Remembrance of the Daleks. 

David Banks makes his final of four appearances in the series in Silver Nemesis as a Cyber-leader.

Serials 

This season was broadcast on Wednesdays.

Broadcast
The entire season was broadcast from 5 October 1988 to 4 January 1989. Transmission moved to Wednesday nights. Season twenty-five was originally to have been broadcast in production order, with The Greatest Show in the Galaxy second. However, the expected start of the season on 7 September was postponed to 5 October as a result of BBC coverage of the Seoul Summer Olympics. Nathan-Turner still wanted to lead off the year with Remembrance of the Daleks and have episode one of the twenty-fifth anniversary story, Silver Nemesis, broadcast on 23 November – the actual date of Doctor Who's 25th anniversary. This left only three weeks in between the two serials. Consequently, the original season finale, The Happiness Patrol, was exchanged with The Greatest Show in the Galaxy.

Home media

VHS releases

DVD and Blu-ray releases

In print

References

Bibliography

 

1988 British television seasons
1989 British television seasons
Season 25
Season 25
25